Idhu Solla Marandha Kadhai is an Indian-Tamil-language Family drama television series, that aired on Colors Tamil and digital platform Voot, which premiered on 7 March 2022 and ended on 23 September 2022 with 147 episodes. It starred Rachitha Mahalakshmi and Vishnu. It is the remake of Colors TV's Na Bole Tum Na Maine Kuch Kaha.

Plot
The story revolves around Sadhana (Rachitha Mahalakshmi), a young widow with two children, fights for justice to her late husband. She fights for her and her husband, who dies in a hospital building collapse, which he is blamed for taking money and using cheap quality material for construction. Arjun (Vishnu), an honest journalist who is investigating the case, Soon, Sadhana and Arjun meet and hate each other due to some misunderstandings. Arjun befriends with Sadhana's daughter, Akshara and the two share a bond.

They help each other in every moment. Slowly Sadhana and Arjun fall in love with each other and Will Sadhana manage to provide for her children while trying to prove her late husband's innocence? Will she end up getting another chance to start her life afresh?

Cast

Main
 Rachitha Mahalakshmi as Sadhana Shankar – Sundar's sister; Shankar's widow; Akshara and Adithya's mother
 Vishnu as Arjun – News reporter at Tamil news company; Lechchami's son; Yamuna and Keerthana's brother; Akshara's friend

Recurring
 Arshita as Akshara "Akshu" Shankar – Sadhana and Shankar's daughter; Adithya's sister; Arjun's friend
 Satvik Dev as Adithya "Adi" Shankar – Sadhana and Shankar's son; Akshara's brother
 Gowthami Vembunathan as Saraswathi Rajasekar – Rajasekar's wife; Saravanan, Shankar and Radha's mother; Abhinaya, Sarath, Akshara and Adithya's grandmother
 Vincent Roy as Rajasekar – Chandrakala's brother; Saraswathi's husband; Saravanan, Shankar and Radha's father; Abhinaya, Sarath, Akshara and Adithya's grandfather
 Deepa Shankar as Chandrakala – Rajasekar's sister; Saravanan, Shankar and Radha's aunt; Sadhana's mother-figure; Abhinaya, Sarath, Akshara and Adithya's grandaunt
 Prakash Rajan as Saravanan Rajasekar – Rajasekar and Saraswathi's elder son; Shankar and Radha's brother; Chithra's husband; Sarath's father
 Sridevi Ashok as Chithra Saravanan – Saravanan's wife; Sarath's mother
 John Marshall as Sarath Saravanan – Saravanan and Chithra's son
 Vidhyamini Subhash as Radha Rajasekar Sundar – Rajasekar and Saraswathi's daughter; Saravanan and Shankar's sister; Sundar's wife; Abhinaya's mother
 Gemini Mani as Sundar – Sadhana's brother; Radha's husband; Abhinaya's father
 Sudhapushpa as Sundar and Sadhana's mother
 Sarath as Raju – Arjun's best friend
 Agalya Saro as Lechchami – Yamuna, Arjun and Keerthana's mother
 Preetha Reddy as Keerthana – Lechchami's younger daughter; Yamuna and Arjun's sister
 Subadhini Subramanian as Yamuna Manokar – Lechchami's elder daughter; Arjun and Keerthana's sister; Manokar's wife
 Raj Kumar Manoharan as Manokar – Yamuna's husband
 Ravi Chandran as Lechchami's husband; Yamuna, Arjun and Keerthana's father

Special Appearance
 Ajai Bharat as Shankar Rajasekar – Rajasekar and Saraswathi's younger son; Saravanan and Radha's brother; Sadhana's late husband; Akshara and Adithya's father (Dead)

Production

Casting
Actress Rachitha Mahalakshmi was selected to play the character Sadhana which Aakanksha Singh played in the Original . Vishnu was selected to play Arjun's character. Where Sridevi Ashok, Deepa Shankar,  Vincent, Gowthami in pivotal roles.

Release
The first promo was unveiled on 7 February 2022, featuring protagonist and revealing the release date. The second promo was unveiled on 12 February 2022 and The third promo was unveiled on 25 February 2022

Adaptations

References

External links 

Colors Tamil original programming
Tamil-language melodrama television series
2022 Tamil-language television series debuts
Tamil-language television shows
Television shows set in Tamil Nadu
2022 Tamil-language television series endings
Tamil-language television series based on Hindi-language television series